Shri Sidhi Vinayagar Temple is a Hindu temple dedicated to the Elephant God Ganesha. It opened in 2011. The temple premises has idols of Ganesha, Murugan, Shiva, Durga, Bhairava and Navagrahas. A new bigger temple is being constructed in the same premises which includes various Hindu Gods. 

It is situated in George Eliot Road, off Foleshill Road, Coventry CV1 4HT and is easily reachable by the local buses. Daily Poojas are performed.

Coventry pillaiyar (கொவென்றி பிள்ளையார்) is yet another name for Coventry Shri Sidhi Vinayagar Devasthanam situated in the heart of England. The temple was founded by local devotees who is very much love with Lord Ganesha. The annual festival of the Temple (தேவஸ்தானம்) is conducted every year beginning with flag hoisting and continued for 10 days. Highlight of this annual event is chariots festival (தேர் திருவிழா) where Lord Ganesha is taken on a beautifully decorated cart pulled by devotees around designated streets of Coventry.

The Hindhu Art College, a wing of Temple Devasthanam, conducts a regular art and Language classes. They also host various community cultural events and attract all communities.

External links 

 website

Buildings and structures in Coventry
Hindu temples in England
Religious buildings and structures in the West Midlands (county)